Jan Wuytens (born 9 June 1985) is a Belgian former professional footballer who played as a centre back.

Career
Wuytens is a defender who was born in Hasselt and began his career with PSV Eindhoven in 1998. He left after six years and joined Heracles Almelo, making his professional debut in the 2005–06 season. On 15 June 2009 league rivals FC Utrecht bought the defender for €900,000.

On 2 August 2016, his contract until 2017 was terminated. He joined KSC Hasselt as a player-assistant in 2017. In June 2018, Wuytens became a youth coach with Genk.

International career
He is a former Belgium Under-19 international.

Personal
Jan is also the cousin of Stijn Wuytens, who plays professionally for AZ Alkmaar.

References

External links
 Voetbal International profile 

1985 births
Living people
Belgian footballers
PSV Eindhoven players
Heracles Almelo players
FC Utrecht players
AZ Alkmaar players
Eredivisie players
Belgian expatriate sportspeople in the Netherlands
Belgian expatriate footballers
Expatriate footballers in the Netherlands
Sportspeople from Hasselt
Footballers from Limburg (Belgium)
Association football defenders
Belgian football managers